Preview was an American subscription television service that launched in 1980. Like its competitors, such as ONTV and SelecTV, Preview was a scrambled UHF subscription channel requiring a special set-top box to decode the signal.

Preview's broadcast day was mainly between 7 p.m. and 5 a.m., but varied depending on the market and during later periods of the channel's existence. Owned by American Television and Communications (ATC), the cable division of Time, Inc., Preview was carried on several independent stations including WCLQ-TV (now Univision owned-and-operated station WQHS-DT) in Cleveland, WSMW-TV (now Univision affiliate WUNI) in the Boston area, and KTWS-TV (now MyNetworkTV owned-and-operated station KDFI) in Dallas. A fourth Preview-branded service, not owned by ATC, was carried by KDNL-TV in St. Louis (later a Fox affiliate, now an ABC affiliate).

The service offered movies, sporting events, and specials. The service also broadcast programming from ONTV and SelecTV, in some cases, simulcasting in areas where any of these services and Preview were available. Preview lasted until 1986, when the last affiliate, WSMW, discontinued carrying the service.

Markets

Boston

Preview was most successful in Boston, its first market, where subscription television programs began to air on WSMW on September 8, 1980. WSMW had to fight competition from StarCase on WQTV channel 68 and a perception that its transmitter in Worcester was weak.

Preview reaped a windfall in February 1983 when Star TV, the renamed StarCase, ceased operations; Preview bought the subscriber list and temporarily simulcast most of its programming on both channels 68 and 27 until it could switch Star TV subscribers to Preview equipment. Preview also progressively expanded its broadcast day; it moved up its start time two hours to 5 pm on March 1, 1983, over objections by the city of Worcester, which feared the loss of its commercial TV station to subscription programs. More Preview hours were freed up by 1984 when Nolanda Hill, the station's owner, axed most of its local programming in response to WSMW's insufficient studio space in Shrewsbury.

Over the course of 1985, Preview progressively cut back its hours until ceasing operations late in 1985. WSMW then relaunched as a general independent station, WHLL.

Cleveland

Preview debuted in Cleveland on March 7, 1981—four days after WCLQ-TV itself, which signed on March 3. It was able to obtain some rights to Cleveland Cavaliers NBA basketball during its operational period. However, as in other markets, Preview struggled. Cleveland's more affluent suburban areas were wired for cable much faster than anticipated, taking away a critical segment of Preview's potential customer base. While Preview Cleveland at its peak numbered nearly 40,000 subscribers, it had fallen to just 23,000 by mid-1983, prompting the STV service to close down effective August 31, 1983. Also cited by observers were poor marketing and customer service.

Dallas

In Dallas, Preview entered one of the most competitive STV markets in the nation; at one point, Preview, ON TV and VEU all operated in the Metroplex.

ATC exited Dallas not by shuttering its Preview service, but by selling it to Golden West Broadcasters, the parent company of VEU, in September 1982. The deal, which was estimated at between $15 and $18 million, combined Preview's 25,000 subscribers with the 42,000 of VEU. VEU, which had broadcast over KNBN-TV, began simulcasting on KTWS, to which all subscribers were moved by mid-December.

St. Louis

Preview in St. Louis was among the shortest-lived STV operations in the country, operating over KDNL-TV in St. Louis for just seven months. It began operating June 1, 1982, with 2,500 households signed up for the first night of programming. In contrast to most STV operations, Preview St. Louis struggled to attract interest from professional sports teams—only seven St. Louis Cardinals baseball games aired on the service, but the St. Louis Blues and St. Louis Steamers expressed no interest. The system had only 10,000 subscribers, and KDNL owner Cox Enterprises announced before the end of the year it would drop Preview on February 28, 1983, laying off 77 employees in the process. Preview struggled with the depressed state of the St. Louis economy and the faster-than-anticipated wiring of area homes for cable. One source quoted by the St. Louis Post-Dispatch estimated the service made a loss of $100,000 a month.

References

Television channels and stations established in 1980
Defunct television networks in the United States
Warner Bros. Discovery subsidiaries
American subscription television services
Television channels and stations disestablished in 1986